Ezer Mizion or Ezer Mitzion (literal translation: "Aid from Zion") is an Israeli health support organization offering a wide range of medical and social support services for Israel's sick, disabled and elderly.

Projects
Ezer Mizion, established in 1979, runs the world's largest Jewish Bone Marrow Donor Registry. this registry was extended significantly by Moti and Bracha Ziser who founded "Oranit house," a center for cancer patients and their families. It also operates specialized programs for special needs children, cancer patients and terror victims.

Ezer Mizion has branches throughout Israel. All of its services are free, with over 10,000 volunteers nationwide.

Awards and recognition
In 2008, the organization was awarded the Israel Prize for lifetime achievement & special contribution to society and the State of Israel.

References

External links
Official website

See also
List of Israel Prize recipients

Charities based in Israel
Medical and health organizations based in Israel
Israel Prize for lifetime achievement & special contribution to society recipients
Israel Prize recipients that are organizations
Organizations established in 1979
Volunteer organizations in Israel